Alexander Leaf (April 10, 1920 – December 24, 2012) was a physician and research scientist best known for his work linking diet and exercise to the prevention of heart disease. He also contributed significantly to establishing the relationship between longer, hotter summers and outbreaks of infectious diseases like malaria in regions previously unaffected by them.

Alexander Leaf was born Alexander Livshiz on April 10, 1920, in Yokohama, Japan. His family had fled there after the Bolshevik Revolution. The family name was changed when they emigrated to Seattle in 1922.

After graduating from University of Washington as a chemistry major in 1940, Dr. Leaf received his medical degree from the University of Michigan in 1943, completing his internship and residency at Massachusetts General Hospital from 1944 to 1946.

Dr. Leaf contributed significantly to the understanding of the causes of heart disease through his research on how sodium and potassium pass through cell walls.

He was chief of medical services at Massachusetts General Hospital from 1966 to 1981. In 1961, he became a founding member of Physicians for Social Responsibility, opposing nuclear proliferation. In 1972, he became one of the first practicing physicians ever elected to the National Academy of Sciences.

References

External links 
 The Alexander Leaf papers – at Harvard Medical Library archives

1920 births
2012 deaths
Members of the United States National Academy of Sciences
University of Washington alumni
University of Michigan Medical School alumni
Japanese emigrants to the United States
American people of Russian descent
Members of the National Academy of Medicine